Napoli Basket, known for sponsorship reasons as GeVi Napoli, is an Italian professional basketball team of the city of Naples. It's the de facto successor of the Basket Napoli which was dissolved in 2009.

The team has achieved the promotion to the Serie A after the end of the 2020–21 season of the Serie A2 Basket.

History

2016–2019: Beginnings
In August 2016, after a corporate failure of Napoli Basketball, Ciro Ruggiero founded a new team, known as Cuore Napoli Basket. The transfer of the sporting title from Cilento Basket Agropoli allowed the newborn Neapolitan team to play in the 2016–17 Serie B. In the same season, Cuore Napoli Basket managed to win promotion to Serie A2, after having arrived first in Group C of the regular season and beat Bergamo Basket in the playoff's final. During the same season Napoli also won his first Italian Cup in the National Basketball League.

At the end of the 2017–18 season, Cuore Napoli Basket relegated to Serie B, after losing in the playouts against Roseto Sharks. At the end of the season, the management passed to the Neapolitan entrepreneurs Federico Grassi and Francesco Tavassi and the club changed its name to Napoli Basket. Gianluca Lulli was signed as new head coach. In 2018–19 Serie B, Napoli Basket closed the regular season at the 6th place in group D with 36 points, but it lost in the semifinals against Pallacanestro Palestrina.

2019–present: Promotion to LBA and first seasons
In June 2019, the club announced that it had purchased the sports title from Legnano Basket Knights, obtaining the right to participate in the 2019–20 Serie A2 season. However, the season began with three consecutive defeats against NPC Rieti, Basket Latina and Junior Casale. Gianluca Lulli was sacked and the expert coach Stefano Sacripanti was signed. Napoli ended the regular season at the 8th place, achieving the second phase, which however was never played due to the COVID-19 pandemic. In the next summer, important players like Josh Mayo and Jordan Parks were signed. In the 2020–21 season, the team won its second Italian LNP Cup (the first in Serie A2), beating APU Udine for 80–69 in the final. On 27 June 2021, following the victory in the playoff's finals against Udine, Napoli was promoted to Lega Basket Serie A (LBA). 

Despite a good start of the season, on 15 March 2022, coach Sacripanti was sacked following several defeats and the club hired Maurizio Buscaglia as new head coach. Moreover, on 29 March, Napoli signed the Lithuanian center Artūras Gudaitis, who had left Zenit Saint Petersburg following the Russian invasion of Ukraine. On May 1, Napoli defeated Fortitudo Bologna at PalaDozza, achieving the salvation from relegation.

Players

Current roster

Depth chart

References

External links 
 Official Site 

2016 establishments in Italy
Basketball teams established in 2016
Basketball teams in Campania
Sport in Naples